Pudozhsky District is an administrative district (raion), one of the fifteen in the Republic of Karelia, Russia. It is located in the southeast of the republic. Its administrative center is the town of Pudozh. As of the 2010 Census, the total population of the district was 21,659, with the population of Pudozh accounting for 44.8% of that number.

Administrative and municipal status
Within the framework of administrative divisions, Pudozhsky District is one of the fifteen in the Republic of Karelia and has administrative jurisdiction over one town (Pudozh) and seventy-two rural localities. As a municipal division, the district is incorporated as Pudozhsky Municipal District. The town of Pudozh and eleven rural localities are incorporated into an urban settlement, while the remaining sixty-one rural localities are incorporated into seven rural settlements within the municipal district. The town of Pudozh serves as the administrative center of both the administrative and municipal district.

References

Notes

Sources



Districts of the Republic of Karelia